Dan Payne (born September 12, 1972) is an American former rugby union player, coach, and college athletic director. He is chief executive officer for Rugby Americas, both North and South America.

Payne was born in Victor, New York. He attended college at Clarion University where he was an All-America wrestler. Payne did not play rugby in his youth, but discovered rugby in 2001 while living in New York. Payne then moved to San Diego where he played for the Old Mission Beach Athletic Club (OMBAC). Payne's position was number eight. He played for the United States national rugby union team, and played for the U.S. at the 2007 Rugby World Cup.

Payne coached for several years at San Diego State University. Payne has been the head coach since 2009 of Life University, which has been one of the strongest teams in college rugby since Life's undergraduate rugby program was created in 2009. Payne was promoted in 2014 to Assistant Athletics Director while still retaining his role as Director of Rugby.
Payne has also served as an assistant coach for the U.S. national rugby team.

Payne was hired as chief executive officer for USA Rugby with his tenure beginning August 1, 2016. Payne described his motivation behind the job as increasing the awareness and participation for rugby in the U.S.

It was announced by World Rugby on April 23, 2018 that Dan had been appointed CEO of Rugby Americas, making him the senior World Rugby official in North and South America. Upon taking this new role, Dan stepped down as CEO of USA Rugby.

See also
 College Premier Division

References

1972 births
Living people
Rugby union props
American rugby union coaches
American rugby union players
United States international rugby union players
People from Victor, New York